The 2016–17 Cypriot Cup was the 75th edition of the Cypriot Cup. A total of 25 clubs were accepted to enter the competition. It began on 26 October 2016 with the first round and concluded on 24 May 2017 with the final held at GSP Stadium. The winner of the Cup was Apollon Limassol for ninth time and qualified for the 2017–18 Europa League second qualifying round

First round
The first round draw took place on 19 October 2016 and the matches played on 26 October and 2, 23, 30 November 2016.

Second round
The second round draw took place on 20 December 2016 and the matches played on 11, 18, 25 January and 1, 8 February 2017.

The following seven teams advanced directly to second round and will meet the nine winners of the first round ties:
Apollon Limassol (2015–16 Cypriot Cup winner)
Omonia (2015–16 Cypriot Cup runners-up)
APOEL (2015–16 Cypriot First Division Fair Play winner)
ASIL Lysi (Wild card, via draw)
Ethnikos Achna (Wild card, via draw)
Ethnikos Assia (Wild card, via draw)
Olympiakos Nicosia (Wild card, via draw)

|}

First leg

Second leg

Quarter-finals
The quarter-finals draw took place on 9 February 2017 and the matches played on 15 and 22 February, 8 March, 5 and 19 April 2017.

}

|}

First leg

Second leg

Semi-finals
The semi-finals draw took place on 20 April 2017, and the matches played on 26 April and 3 May 2017.

|}

First leg

Second leg

Final

See also	
 2016–17 Cypriot First Division	
 2016–17 Cypriot Second Division

Notes

Sources

References

	

Cup
Cyprus
Cypriot Cup seasons